The Senior women's race at the 2010 IAAF World Cross Country Championships was held at the Myślęcinek Park in Bydgoszcz, Poland, on March 28, 2010.  Reports of the event were given in the Herald and for the IAAF.

Complete results for individuals, and for teams were published.

Race results

Senior women's race (7.759 km)

Individual

Teams

Note: Athletes in parentheses did not score for the team result.

Participation
According to an unofficial count, 86 athletes from 27 countries participated in the Senior women's race.  This is in agreement with the official numbers as published.

 (5)
 (1)
 (4)
 (1)
 (1)
 (3)
 (6)
 (2)
 (1)
 (1)
 (6)
 (1)
 (6)
 (1)
 (6)
 (1)
 (1)
 (1)
 (6)
 (6)
 (1)
 (6)
 (5)
 (1)
 (2)
 (5)
 (6)

See also
 2010 IAAF World Cross Country Championships – Senior men's race
 2010 IAAF World Cross Country Championships – Junior men's race
 2010 IAAF World Cross Country Championships – Junior women's race

References

Senior women's race at the World Athletics Cross Country Championships
IAAF World Cross Country Championships
2010 in women's athletics